West Lake Provincial Park is a provincial park in British Columbia, Canada.

External links
British Columbia Parks
British Columbia Adventure

Provincial parks of British Columbia